Shaanxi Construction Engineering Group Corporation (operating as Top International Engineering Corporation in international markets) is a Chinese construction and engineering contractor.  SCEGC was established in 1950, and is among the Top 500 Chinese Corporations.

Projects
The company in overseas operations is active across Africa and a few countries elsewhere. The main concentration of overseas branches is in West Africa with subsidiaries in Cameroon, Sao Tome & Principe, Sudan, Equatorial Guinea, Liberia, Gabon, Nigeria, Ghana, and Cape Verde.  Other offices are located in the UAE, Papua New Guinea, Rwanda, and Congo.

In Ghana, it is the leading sub-contractor in a joint project with local firms to build 320 apartment blocks comprising 2,560 units designated by the government to meet an affordable housing shortfall.

Philanthropy
During the 2007 floods in the Upper East Region of Ghana, the local subsidiary of SGEGC made a cash donation to relief for flood victims.

References

External links

Construction and civil engineering companies of China
Companies based in Xi'an
Chinese companies established in 1950
Construction and civil engineering companies established in 1950